St Philip Neri Church is a Roman Catholic parish church in Mansfield, Nottinghamshire, England. It was founded by Edward Bagshawe, Bishop of Nottingham. It was built from 1924 to 1925 and designed by Charles A. Edeson and was influenced by Brompton Oratory, where Bishop Bagshawe formerly served. It is located on Chesterfield Road South to the north of the town centre. It is in the Italian Baroque style and is a Grade II listed building.

History

Foundation
For a short while during 1862, a priest would come from Ilkeston to celebrate Mass in the Catholic Church in a property in Chandler's Court. In 1876, a Mrs Susanna White bought and then gave the Manor House in Ratcliffe Gate to Bishop Bagshawe. In 1877, St Philip Neri Chapel was opened there. In 1878, a building housing a school and a chapel was built in the grounds of Manor House. It was designed by a Mr Christopher Gray from London.

Construction
In 1921, the priest there, a Fr Charles Payne sought to build the current church. The successor to Bishop Bagshawe, Bishop Brindle gave the land to the parish. On that site, on 6 June 1924, the foundation stone was laid by Bishop Brindle's successor, Thomas Dunn. The church was designed by a local architect, Charles Alva 'Percy' Edeson. On 24 March 1925, the church was consecrated and opened by the Archbishop of Westminster, Cardinal Bourne, the next day, 25 March, the feast of the Annunciation. In 1926, Fr Payne moved to Derby, his successor Fr John Keogh went about getting the church decorated and installed the paintings. In 1934, the work was completed. It was done by Hardman & Co. and the cost came to £2,000. The total cost of the church came to £17,500. In 1932, the parish hall was built.

Parish
The parish of St Philip Neri Church works other with other parishes in and around Mansfield, such as St Joseph's Church in Shirebrook, St Bernadette’s Church in Bolsover, and St Teresa’s Church, Market Warsop and St Patrick's Church in Forest Town. St Philip Neri Church has four Sunday Masses at 6:00pm on Saturday, 9:00am, 11:00am and 5:00pm on Sunday.

See also
 Diocese of Nottingham

References

External links
 

Buildings and structures in Mansfield
Roman Catholic churches in Nottinghamshire
Grade II listed churches in Nottinghamshire
20th-century Roman Catholic church buildings in the United Kingdom
Roman Catholic churches completed in 1925
Grade II listed Roman Catholic churches in England
1877 establishments in England
English Baroque church buildings
Roman Catholic Diocese of Nottingham